This is a list of members of the South Australian House of Assembly from 1979 to 1982, as elected at the 1979 state election:

 The election of the Liberal member for Norwood, Frank Webster was overturned by the Court of Disputed Returns on 22 January 1980. Labor candidate and former member Greg Crafter won the resulting by-election on 16 February 1980.
 The Democrat member for Mitcham, Robin Millhouse, resigned on 7 April 1982 on his appointment to the Supreme Court of South Australia. Democrat candidate Heather Southcott won the resulting by-election on 8 May 1982.
 The Labor member for Florey, Harold O'Neill, resigned on 11 August 1982. Labor candidate Bob Gregory won the resulting by-election on 4 September 1982.

Members of South Australian parliaments by term
20th-century Australian politicians